Pérez Castellanos, also known as Castro - Pérez Castellanos, is a barrio (neighbourhood or district) of Montevideo, Uruguay. In the new division of Montevideo in municipalities and "communal centre zones", Pérez Castellanos belongs to municipality D and CCZ 11.

Location
This barrio borders Cerrito to the west, Las Acacias to the northwest, Ituzaingó to the northeast, Villa Española to the east, Mercado Modelo to the southeast and Bolívar to the southwest. It is home to the barracks of the "Blandengues de Artigas".

Places of worship
 Parish Church of the Annunciation (Roman Catholic)
 Parish Church of Our Lady of the Foundation (Roman Catholic)

See also 
Barrios of Montevideo

References

External links

Barrios of Montevideo